Sophie Cunningham  is an Australian writer and editor based in Melbourne. She is the current Chair of the Board of the Australian Society of Authors, the national peak body representing Australian authors.

Career

Publisher 

Cunningham was publisher at McPhee Gribble/Penguin for two years and Trade Publisher at Allen & Unwin for ten years; there she was known for commissioning and editing innovative fiction and non-fiction. At McPhee Gribble the books she worked on included I Was a Teenage Fascist by David Greason, Glad All Over: The Countdown Years 1974–1987 by Peter Wilmoth and Holding the Man by Timothy Conigrave.

At Allen & Unwin she published Mark Davis's Gangland: Cultural Elites and the New Generationalism.

Author 

In 2004 her own first novel, Geography, was published. In 2005 she was an Asialink resident in Sri Lanka, which provided research material for her novel Bird, which follows the life of a singer-actress who became a Buddhist nun.

Her non-fiction book Melbourne was published in 2011. Part memoir, part history, it is a portrait of the city as experienced through her own memories over the course of a year. In 2012 it was longlisted for the National Biography Award. It was re-issued in November 2020 with a new cover and introduction.

Warning: The Story of Cyclone Tracy was published by Text Publishing in 2014 and longlisted for the Walkley Award; Shortlisted for the Nita Kibble Award, the NIB Waverley Library Literary Award, University of Southern Queensland History Book Award and the Northern Territory History Award. 
City of Trees: Essays on Life, Death and the need for a Forest, also Text Publishing was published in 2019. Her first book for children, Tippy and Jellybean – The True Story of a Brave Koala who Saved her Baby from a Bushfire, was illustrated by Anil Tortop and published by Allen and Unwin in 2020, and her second, Flipper and Finnegan — The True Story of How Tiny Jumpers Saved Little Penguins in 2022.

Her novel This Devastating Fever was published in September 2022.

Cunningham has also written works of journalism, including travel writing, cultural analysis, and writing on Buddhism and television. From 2002 to 2005, she wrote the Couch Life column for the television section of The Age.

Editor 

In 2008 Cunningham became the editor of Meanjin and aimed to make the literary magazine "lighter, more fun, but I don't mean lightweight." She also aimed to establish a younger audience for the magazine.

During her time as editor, Cunningham significantly expanded the magazine's online presence and launched several successful public events in Melbourne and Sydney (notably Meanland, in collaboration with Jeff Sparrow, editor of fellow literary journal Overland) to lead public debate on issues around digital publishing.

In 2010 she resigned, claiming she had been locked out of discussions about the publication's future and believed its owner, Melbourne University Press, intended to cease publishing the print edition. "I was not formally consulted once," she told Crikey. "I do know there was a sense – expressed by MUP – that I was not working with MUP closely enough and was being too independent. I had understood my task to be to keep Meanjin'''s separate identity."

Although there was speculation Meanjin would move to an online-only format, MUP chairman Alan Kohler denied this was the case.

 Stella Prize 

In 2011 Cunningham was part of a group of 11 Australian women writers, editors, publishers and booksellers who became concerned about the poor representation of books by women in Australia's top literary prize, the Miles Franklin Award. In response, they established the Stella Prize (named after Stella Miles Franklin), a $50,000 annual award for writing by Australian women in all genres, similar to the UK's Orange Prize.

"After a rapid acceleration in women's rights in the '70s and '80s, things have started to go backwards," Cunningham said in a keynote address at the 2011 Melbourne Writers' Festival. "Women continue to be marginalised in Australian culture and, the arts sector – which likes to pride itself on its liberal values – is, in fact, complacent. Women are much less likely to win literary awards, to write reviews of books, or have their books reviewed. This, despite the fact they write about half the books published."

Awards and recognition

Cunningham was made a Member of the Order of Australia (AM) in the 2019 Queen's Birthday Honours in recognition of her "significant service to literature as an author, editor and role model".

She has received the following awards for her work:
 City of Trees: Essays on Life, Death and the Need for a Forest Melbourne 2019 longlisted 'The Nib': CAL Waverley Library Award for Literature
 'Staying with the Trouble' essay winner of 2015 Calibre Prize
 Warning 2015 winner 'The Nib': CAL Waverley Library Award for Literature – The Alex Buzo Shortlist Prize and University of Southern Queensland History Book Award and the Northern Territory History Award
 This Devastating Fever was shortlisted for the 2023 Victorian Premier's Prize for Fiction

 Personal life 

Cunningham lives in Melbourne with her wife Virginia Murdoch. She is the daughter of deceased literary scholar and critic Peter Nicholls.

Bibliography

BooksGeography (Text, 2004), Bird  (Text, 2008), Melbourne (UNSW Press, 2011), Warning: The Story of Cyclone Tracy (Text, 2014), City of Trees: Essays on Life, Death and the Need for a Forest (Text, 2019) Tippy and Jellybean – The True Story of a Brave Koala who Saved her Baby from a Bushfire (Text, 2020) Fire, Flood, Plague: Australian Writers Respond to 2020, Edited by Sophie Cunningham (Penguin Random House, 2020), Wonder – 175 Years of the Royal Botanic Gardens  Written by Sophie Cunningham and Peter Wilmoth with photographs by Leigh Henningham (Hardie Grant, 2021) Flipper and Finnegan – The True Story of How Tiny Jumpers Saved Little Penguins (Albert Street Books, 2022) This Devastating Fever  (Ultimo Press, 2022), 

Book reviews

Critical studies and reviews of Cunningham's workFire, flood, plague''

References

External links 
 Sophiecunningham.com
 Stripped Bare
 Meanjin's new editor, Sophie Cunningham
 Sophie Cunningham takes a flight of fancy with Bird

1963 births
Living people
21st-century Australian novelists
Australian magazine editors
Australian non-fiction writers
Australian women novelists
Writers from Melbourne
21st-century Australian women writers
Women magazine editors
Members of the Order of Australia